Dr Preston King (1862-1943) was the Mayor of Bath in 1913 and 1917–18.

Dr King was born in Great Barton in Suffolk on 14 September 1862, and educated at Bury St Edmunds Grammar School. He gained entrance to Cavendish Hall, Cambridge in 1881 and after clinical training at St Thomas' Hospital London, and a brief spell as a ship's surgeon, he was appointed as the resident medical house officer at the Royal Mineral Water Hospital in Bath and assistant physician at the Royal United Hospital (RUH). He married Margaretta Bond in 1898 and served as a councillor for Bath City Council, before being appointed as Mayor in 1913.

Notes

References

Mayors of Bath, Somerset
People from Bath, Somerset
1863 births
1943 deaths